James Bicknell Castle (November 27, 1855 – April 5, 1918) was a Honolulu businessman in times of the Kingdom of Hawaii, Republic of Hawaii and Territory of Hawaii.

Life
James Bicknell Castle was born November 27, 1855 in Honolulu. His father was Samuel Northrup Castle (1808–1894), and mother was Mary Tenney Castle (1819–1907). He attended Punahou School 1867–1873, and then Oberlin College. He greatly expanded Castle & Cooke in the sugar and railroad industries. He is credited with winning control of the Hawaiian Commercial & Sugar Company from Claus Spreckels in 1898, which he sold to Alexander & Baldwin for a large share of their stock. This episode resulting in a lawsuit by the former manager of the plantation, William J. Lowrie.
He bought large amounts of land, such as Kaneohe Ranch.

He served as an officer in the Kingdom of Hawaii army in 1890, and was appointed to the Bureau of Immigration. In 1891 he was acting Auditor General, and Collector General of Customs from April 15, 1893 to August 31, 1897. Later in 1897 he served as secretary of the delegation from the Republic of Hawaii sent to Washington, D.C., to lobby for annexation at the request of Lorrin Andrews Thurston.

During the decade up to 1906, he tried to lure white labor colonists to the Islands. The last failed effort was organized by Peter Demens who offered to bring all Spiritual Christians from Russia to Hawaii, and cost Castle $30,000.

He built a large house called Kainalu near Diamond Head. When the Honolulu Rapid Transit & Land Co. was in danger of failing, he used his financial resources to keep the effort alive.

Castle married Julia Matilda White (1849–1943), daughter of cotton mill owner Nelson Davis White (1819–1889) in Winchendon, Massachusetts on November 2, 1879.
Their son Harold Kainalu Long Castle (1886–1967) expanded the business and donated land for several educational institutions. 
They also had two sons Nelson Northrop (1885) and Kenneth Kingsbury (1888) who both died young.

Castle died April 5, 1918. Two days later Benjamin Dillingham died, who married a distant cousin, and partnered in building railroads to the Castle plantations.

He and his wife are buried in the cemetery at  Kawaiahaʻo Church, across the street from where he was born.
James B. Castle High School and the  Castle Medical Center are named for him.

Family tree

References

1855 births
1918 deaths
Businesspeople from Hawaii
Punahou School alumni
Oberlin College alumni
Hawaiian Kingdom politicians
Republic of Hawaii politicians
19th-century American businesspeople